The rugby sevens tournaments at the 2024 Summer Olympics in Paris are scheduled to run from 24 to 30 July at Stade de France. Twenty-four teams (twelve each for men and women) will compete against each other in their respective tournaments. For the first time, the rugby sevens matches will commence two days before the opening ceremony with the men's preliminary and quarterfinal stages. The competition takes a break for the opening ceremony on 26 July before the medal-winning teams are officially unveiled a day later. The women's tournament will be held between 28 and 30 July, culminating with the gold and bronze medal matches.

Qualification
The International Olympic Committee and the World Rugby (WR) have ratified and released the qualification criteria for Paris 2024. The host nation France reserves a direct quota place each in the men's and women's tournament with the remainder of the total quota attributed to the eligible NOCs across three qualifying routes.

The top four squads at the end of the 2022–23 World Rugby Sevens Series will secure the men's and women's spots for their respective NOC, with the continental champions from each of the six confederations (Africa, Asia, Europe, Oceania, North America, and South America) receiving the berths at their designated 2023 World Rugby Regional Association Olympic Qualification Tournaments. To complete the twelve-team field for Paris 2024, the remaining spot will be offered to the winner of the 2024 Final Olympic Qualification Tournament to be scheduled a month before the Games commence.

Qualification Summary

Men's qualification

Women's qualification

Medal summary

Medal table

Events

See also
Rugby sevens at the 2022 Asian Games
Rugby sevens at the 2023 European Games
Rugby sevens at the 2023 Pan American Games

References

 
2024
2024 Summer Olympics events
Olympics